Abietinella (plant) is a genus of moss belonging to the family Thuidiaceae.

The genus was first described by Johann Karl August Müller.

Species:
 Abietinella abietina 
Abietinella abietina var. abietina 
 Abietinella brandisii 
 Abietinella hystricosa

References

Hypnales
Moss genera